J-Town is a nickname for:

 Japantown, enclaves of ethnic Japanese outside Japan
 Japantown, San Francisco, California, U.S.
 Japantown, San Jose, California, U.S.
 Jakarta, Indonesia
 Jefferson, South Carolina, U.S.
 Jeffersontown, Kentucky, U.S.
 Jinjang, Malaysia
 Johnstown, Pennsylvania, U.S.
 Jonesboro, Arkansas, U.S.
 Joplin, Missouri, U.S.
 Jos, Plateau, Nigeria
 Little Tokyo, Los Angeles, California, U.S.
 Jeddah, Saudi Arabia
 Jerusalem, Israel
 Rzeszów–Jasionka Airport, Poland

See also
 Jimmy "J-Town" Wizard, a member of the English bands Violent Reaction and Higher Power